The Silver City Historic District is a historically significant mining area in northwestern Owyhee County, Idaho, United States. Along with Silver City, it encompasses the communities of Ruby City, Boonsville, Dewey, and Fairvlew, along with major silver mines on War Eagle Mountain and Florida Mountain.

See also

 National Register of Historic Places listings in Owyhee County, Idaho

References

External links

 
Geography of Grant County, New Mexico
Historic districts on the National Register of Historic Places in New Mexico
National Register of Historic Places in Grant County, New Mexico